The Battle of Albelda may refer to either of two battles of the Reconquista:
Battle of Albelda (851), between Gascons and Muslims
Battle of Monte Laturce (859), between Asturians and Muslims